The 2014 Judo Grand Slam Tyumen was held in Tyumen, Russia, from 12 to 13 July 2014.

Medal summary

Men's events

Women's events

Source Results

Medal table

References

External links
 

2014 IJF World Tour
2014 Judo Grand Slam
Judo competitions in Russia
Judo
Judo